Francisque Teyssier (born 2 January 1969 in Salon-de-Provence) is a French former professional racing cyclist. He competed in the 1995 Giro d'Italia, 1996 Tour de France and the 1997 Vuelta a España. He also won the French National Time Trial Championships twice, in 1997 and 2000.

Major results

1992
 1st Overall Rhône-Alpes Isère Tour
 1st Grand Prix de France
 2nd Overall Vuelta a los Pirineos
1993
 3rd National Road Race Championships
1994
 1st Stages 3 & 6 Tour du Poitou-Charentes
 7th Overall Route du Sud
1995
 1st Stage 5 Tour de l'Ain
 4th Grand Prix d'Ouverture La Marseillaise
1997
 1st  National Time Trial Championships
 3rd Chrono des Nations
1998
 1st Grand Prix des Nations
 1st Stage 3b Regio-Tour (ITT)
 2nd National Time Trial Championships
 3rd Chrono des Nations
 10th Grand Prix de Villers-Cotterêts
2000
 1st  National Time Trial Championships
 8th Chrono des Herbiers

References

1969 births
Living people
French male cyclists
People from Salon-de-Provence
Sportspeople from Bouches-du-Rhône
Cyclists from Provence-Alpes-Côte d'Azur